Luxe Radio is a privately owned francophone Moroccan radio network. It focuses on fashion and lifestyle topics, and presents news and social, economic, and political debates. It plays exclusively cover versions of songs, particularly in lounge and electronic dance styles. Luxe Radio is based in Casablanca, Morocco, and broadcasts in Casablanca, Rabat, Jadida, Marrakesh, Essaouira, Agadir, Settat, and Asfi.

History 
In 2008, Abdessamad Aboulghali responded to an international call for projects put out by Morocco's High Commission for Audio-Visual Communication, a regulatory commission established by King Muhammad VI. Among 4 stations selected, Luxe Radio got its license on February 23, 2009. On March 1, it began broadcasting with five programs: Les Matins Luxe with Seddik Khalfi, Diamant rose with Ikram El Ghinaoui, Avec ou sans parure with Youssef Ait Akdim, Superflu with Habib Hemch and Les Nuits magiques with Karim Allam Bouché. The station's general director was Ilham Alami.

 7:30 am – 10:00 am: "Les Matins Luxe"
 Noon - 1:00 pm: "Heure Essentielle"
 2:00 pm – 3:30 pm: "Avec ou sans Parure",
 Afternoon features :
 3:45 pm: 
 4:00 pm: 
 4:15 pm: 
 4:30 pm: 
 4:45 pm: 
 5:00 pm: 
 5:15 pm: 
 5:30 pm: 
 5:45 pm:

Frequencies 
FM frequencies by city:

 Casablanca : 99.2 MHz
 Rabat : 105.4 MHz
 Jadida : 98.0 MHz
 Marrakesh : 101.2 MHz
 Agadir : 102.4 MHz
 Essaouira : 102.0 MHz
 Settat : 102.4 MHz
 Asfi : 100.4 MHz

References

External links

Radio stations established in 2010
Radio stations in Morocco